Loubens is the name of several communes in France:

 Loubens, Ariège, in the Ariège department
 Loubens, Gironde, in the Gironde department